Johann or Johannes Bach (26 November 1604 – buried 13 May 1673) was a German composer and musician of the Baroque. He was the father of the so-called "Erfurt line" of Bach family musicians.

Born in Erfurt, Johannes was the eldest son of Johannes Hans Bach and the brother of Christoph Bach and Heinrich Bach.  All three were composers.  He spent seven years studying under Johann Christoph Hoffmann, a stadtpfeifer in Suhl. From 1634 he served as organist at St. Johannis church in Schweinfurt, and was later organist at Suhl.

In 1635 he became town musician and director of the Raths-Musikanten in Erfurt, and was organist at the town's Predigerkirche from 1636. His first wife, Barbara Hoffman (a daughter of his teacher), died half an hour after bearing a stillborn son in 1639. Following this he married Hedwig Lämmerhirt, the daughter of a town councilman in Erfurt. His children from this marriage included Johannes Christian Bach, Johann Aegidius Bach, and Johann Nicolaus Bach.

Bach's works included two motets, Unser Leben ist ein Schatten and Sei nun wieder zufrieden, and an aria, Weint nicht um meinen Tod.

See also
 Altbachisches Archiv
 Bach family

References

 Entry for "Johann(es) Bach" under "Bach", The New Grove Dictionary of Music and Musicians online.

External links

1604 births
1673 deaths
17th-century classical composers
Johannes Bach
German Baroque composers
German classical composers
German male classical composers
Musicians from Erfurt